The 132nd Tank Regiment is a tank regiment of the Italian Army based in Cordenons in Friuli Venezia Giulia. Originally the regiment, like all Italian tank units, was part of the infantry, but since 1 June 1999 it is part of the cavalry. Operationally the regiment is assigned to the 132nd Armored Brigade "Ariete".

History

World War II 

The 32nd Tank Infantry Regiment had been deployed to Italian Libya on 24 January 1941 to rebuild Italian forces after the Italian 10th Army had been annihilated during the British Operation Compass. The 32nd regiment fielded the I, II, and III tank battalions "L" with useless L3 tankettes and the VII, VIII, and IX tank battalions "M" with M13/40 tanks. As the regiment's L3/35 tankettes were useless the commander of the 132nd Armored Division "Ariete" General Ettore Baldassarre demanded repeatedly to be sent M13/40 tanks to re-equip the regiment's three "L" battalions or be sent "M" tank battalions. Ultimately the High Command in Rome settled on a plan to repatriate the men of the 32nd and retrain them at the 32nd's depot in Verona. Therefore, the 4th Tank Infantry Regiment raised a new command company, which was transferred to Libya on 1 June 1941 and gave birth to the 132nd Tank Infantry Regiment on 1 September 1941.

After its activation the 132nd regiment received the three "M" battalions of its sister regiment, whose return to Italy was repeatedly postponed, until both regiments were heavily invested and decimated during the British Operation Crusader, fighting battles at Bir el Gubi on 19 November and 4-7 December and for Point 175 before retreating West.

As the Ariete division had lost 76% of its men during Operation Crusader the 32nd regiment was taken out of the front on 31 December 1941 and sent to the rear. On 8 January 1942 the 32nd was disbanded and its personnel used to bring the 132nd regiment partially back up to strength for Erwin Rommel's second offensive. The 132nd regiment was now the only Italian tank regiment in the North African theater.

In February 1942 the 133rd Tank Infantry Regiment reached Libya. After its arrival the 133rd Tank Infantry Regiment was forced to cede two of its three battalions to units, who had been decimated during the Panzer Army Africa's advance to Gazala in the preceding weeks: the XI Tank Battalion "M" with M13/40 tanks was ceded to the 101st Motorized Division "Trieste", while the X Tank Battalion "M" with M14/41 tanks was ceded to the 132nd regiment. This allowed the 132nd to disband the VII Tank Battalion "M", whose men and tanks were used to fill the gaps in the regiment's two remaining M13/40 tank battalions. As the 133rd's XII tank battalion had lost one of its companies to British warplanes in the Mediterranean the 132nd remained the only Italian tank regiment in the North African theater until the 133rd was able to move to the front on 31 May 1942.

Battle of Gazala 

In the meantime Rommel had renewed his offensive operations with the Battle of Gazala. The 132nd regiment fielded 169 tanks, 87 officers, 245 non-commissioned officers and 1,437 soldiers for the upcoming operation. The Ariete division was tasked to swing around the heavily fortified Bir Hakeim position and attack it from the rear. On 27 May 1942 the 132nd regiment encountered the 3rd Indian Motor Brigade at Rugbet el Atasc and sent its veteran VIII and IX tank battalions forward, while the fresh X tank battalion was in second line.

After over-running the 3rd Indian Motor Brigade, the tank battalions of the 132nd Tank Infantry Regiment moved to the north-east of Bir Hakeim and the IX Battalion with sixty tanks, changed direction towards the fort of Bir Hakeim defended by the 1st Free French Brigade. The IX Battalion arrived before the Bir Hakeim minefield and barbed wire at  charged and lost  and a Semovente 75/18 self-propelled gun. Ten tanks got through the minefield and were knocked out by French 75 mm anti-tank guns, causing  casualties. The remnants of the IX Battalion retired to the main body of the Ariete, which moved north towards Bir el Harmat around noon, following Rommel's original plan, while the Battle of Bir Hakeim continued for another two weeks.  After having defeated the British at Gazala the Axis offensive continued with the capture of Tobruk and the Battle of Mersa Matruh.

El Alamein 
After having pursued the British Eighth Army to El Alamein Rommel attacked on 1 July 1942 in the First Battle of El Alamein. By 3 July Axis forces were heavily decimated and Rommel paused his attack, which allowed the 132nd Tank Infantry Regiment to pull back to the abandoned British RAF El Daba airfield where the VIII tank battalion had to be disbanded to bring the remaining two battalions partially up to strength. By 15 July the 132nd was back at the front attacking the 22nd British Armoured Brigade to the south of Ruweisat Ridge.
 
In early August the 132nd received the XIII Tank Battalion "M" with M14/41 tanks, which originally had been raised by the 32nd Tank Infantry Regiment's depot in Verona for service in Libya, but had been assigned to the 31st Tank Infantry Regiment instead. Now again at full strength the 132nd was ready for Rommel's next attempt to break through at El Alamein. During the resulting Battle of Alam el Halfa the regiment was heavily engaged at El Qattara.

On 23 October 1942 the Second Battle of El Alamein commenced during which the 132nd regiment clashed repeatedly with British armored formations, but on 4 November the entire Ariete Division was encircled by the 7th British Armoured Division and annihilated. The 132nd Tank Infantry Regiment was declared lost 20 November 1942.

The few survivors of the 132nd Tank Infantry Regiment, 133rd Tank Infantry Regiment, and XI Tank Battalion "M" of the 101st Motorized Division "Trieste" were grouped together in the "Cantaluppi" Group, an ad hoc formation commanded by Colonel Gaetano Cantaluppi, which received the XIV Tank Battalion "M" with M14/41 tanks from the 31st Tank Infantry Regiment, after that regiment's arrival in North Africa. The "Cantaluppi" Group went on to form the short-lived 132nd Anti-tank Regiment, whose creation as officially sanctioned as having been on 5 December 1942 and which was declared lost on 18 April 1943 after the Battle of El Guettar in the Tunisian Campaign.

For its service from Bir el Gubi to El Alamein the 132nd Tank Infantry Regiment was Italy's highest military honor the Gold Medal of Military Valour.

Sardinia 
After having been destroyed twice the 132nd Tank Infantry Regiment was raised again on 21 March 1944 in Sardinia, as part of the Italian Co-belligerent Army. While the 32nd Tank Infantry Regiment had been sent to Sardinia in September 1942 to defend the island against an allied invasion, then 132nd regiment's task was to manage and maintain the equipment of the for a number of reserve battalions. During this time the regiment's structure was as follows:

 32nd Tank Infantry Regiment, in Sanluri
 I Tank Battalion "L" (L3/35 tankettes)
 II Tank Battalion "L"  (L3/35 tankettes) 
 III Semovente Battalion "L" (Semovente 47/32 self-propelled guns) 
 IV Semovente Battalion "L" (Semovente 47/32 self-propelled guns)
 V Semovente Battalion "L" (Semovente 47/32 self-propelled guns)

On 15 May 1944 the Infantry Division "Granatieri di Sardegna" was raised again in Sardinia and the 32nd and 132nd regiments joined the division, which remained static on the island. On 27 August 1944 the 132nd Tank Infantry Regiment was disbanded, followed by the Granatieri division on 31 August, and 32nd regiment on 2 October 1944.

Cold War 
Immediately after ratification of the peace treaty between the allies and Italy on 15 September 1947 the Italians began to rebuild their army. A first tank battalion with M4 Sherman tanks was raised in spring 1948 in Rome, which moved in June to Casarsa della Delizia to make room for a second M4 Sherman tank battalion. On 10 July 1948 the two battalions were used to form the 1st Tankers Regiment in Rome, which joined the Armored Brigade "Ariete" on 7 September 1948. The brigade had been reformed earlier on 1 June 1948 without units. Regiment and brigade moved in fall 1948 to the Friuli Venezia Giulia region - the regiment to Casarsa della Delizia and the brigade headquarters to Pordenone. On 1 April 1949 the 1st Tankers Regiment was renamed 132nd Tankers Regiment "Ariete" and on 28 April 1950 it moved to Aviano.

On 1 October 1952 the Armored Brigade "Ariete" was expanded to Armored Division "Ariete" and consequently the 132nd regiment raised a third M4 Sherman tank battalion in 1953, but had to cede it to the reformed 31st Tankers Regiment within a few weeks. In 1954 the regiment formed a M26 Pershing tank battalion for itself and its two other battalions were also re-equipped with M26 Pershing tanks. In 1955 the three battalions of the regiment were renumbered and given the traditions of three of the battalions that had served with the 132nd during the Western Desert Campaign. In December 1958 the regiment was renamed 132nd Tank Regiment. At this time the regiment was structured as follows:

 132nd Tank Regiment, in Aviano
 VII Tank Battalion (M4 Sherman tanks)
 VIII Tank Battalion (M4 Sherman tanks)
 X Tank Battalion (M4 Sherman tanks)

On 1 March 1964 the 32nd Tank Regiment was reformed and joined the 132nd in the Ariete Division. During the same year the 132nd Tank Regiment ceded its VII Tank Battalion to the 8th Bersaglieri Regiment and received the XXXVIII Bersaglieri Battalion in return.

8th Tank Battalion "M.O. Secchiaroli" 

During the 1975 army reform the 132nd Tank Regiment was disbanded on 31 October 1975 and its VIII Tank Battalion became the 8th Tank Battalion "M.O. Secchiaroli", while the X Tank Battalion became the 10th Tank Battalion "M.O. Bruno", and its XXXVIII Bersaglieri Battalion became the 27th Bersaglieri Battalion "Jamiano". The flag and traditions of the disbanded regiment were assigned to the 8th Tank Battalion "M.O. Secchiaroli". Tank and armored battalions created during the 1975 army reform were all named for officers, soldiers and partisans, who were posthumously awarded Italy's highest military honor the Gold Medal of Military Valour for heroism during World War II. The 8th Tank Battalion's name commemorated 132nd Tank Infantry Regiment Corporal Giovanni Secchiaroli, who had fought with the VIII Tank Battalion in North Africa and was killed in action on 27 May 1942 during the Battle of Rugbet el Atasc. Equipped with M60A1 Patton main battle tanks the battalion joined the Armored Brigade "Manin", whose headquarters had been formed from the 132nd Tank Regiment's headquarters.

10th Tank Battalion "M.O. Bruno" 

The 10th Tank Battalion "M.O. Bruno" was formed during the 1975 army reform by renaming the X Tank Battalion of the 132nd Tank Regiment. The 10th Bruno received the flag and traditions of the 133rd Tank Regiment.

In 1986 the Italian Army disbanded its remaining divisions and to retain the historically significant name "Ariete" the Armored Brigade "Manin" was renamed Armored Brigade "Ariete" on 1 October 1986.

Recent times 
After the end of the Cold War the Italian Army began to reorganize its forces and for traditional reasons battalions were renamed as regiments without changing size or composition. On 27 July 1992 the 8th Tank Battalion "M.O. Secchiaroli" entered the newly reformed 132nd Tank Regiment. On 31 July 1995 the 63rd Tank Regiment in Cordenons transferred from the Mechanized Brigade "Mantova" to the Ariete brigade and on 30 November of the same year the 63rd Tank Regiment was renamed as 132nd Tank Regiment and the tank unit in Aviano was disbanded.

From 29 December 1992 to 15 March 1994 the regiment participated with in the international Unified Task Force and UNOSOM II missions in Somalia. For its conduct and service in Somalia the regiment was awarded a Bronze Medal of Army Valour, which was affixed to the regiment's flag and added to the regiment's coat of arms.

Current structure 
As of 2022 the 132nd Tank Regiment consists of:

  Regimental Command, in Cordenons
 Command and Logistic Support Company "Bengasi"
 8th Tank Battalion "M.O. Secchiaroli"
 1st Tank Company "Rugbet El Atasc" (13x Ariete AMV main battle tanks)
 2nd Tank Company "El Alamein" (13x Ariete AMV main battle tanks)
 3rd Tank Company "Tobruch" (13x Ariete AMV main battle tanks)
 4th Tank Company "Bir Hacheim" (Disbanded)

The Command and Logistic Support Company fields the following platoons: C3 Platoon, Transport and Materiel Platoon, Medical Platoon, and Commissariat Platoon. In total the regiment fields 41x Ariete AMV main battle tanks: 13x per company, plus one for the battalion commander and one for the regiment commander.

See also 
 132nd Armored Brigade "Ariete"

Further reading

External links
Italian Army Website: 132° Reggimento Carri

References

Tank Regiments of Italy